Reverser may refer to:
Thrust reverser
Reversing gear, often called a reverser, controls the valves on a steam engine
Reverser handle, an operating lever for a locomotive